David Rousseau (born 1960) is a British systems philosopher, Director of the Centre for Systems Philosophy, chair of the Board of Trustees of the International Society for the Systems Sciences (ISSS), a Past President of the ISSS (2017-2018), and the Company Secretary of the British Association for the Study of Spirituality.  He is known for having revived interest in establishing a scientific general systems theory (GST), for promoting systems philosophy as a route to advances in GST, for contributions on scientific general systems principles and for advocating systems research as a route to a scientific understanding of spiritual and other exceptional human experiences. His research interests include systems philosophy, systems science, systems engineering, systems methods for exploratory research, the mind-body problem, and the ontological foundations of moral intuitions.

References

External links 
 David Rousseau

Living people
1960 births
Date of birth missing (living people)
Place of birth missing (living people)
British systems scientists
Philosophers of science
20th-century British philosophers
21st-century British philosophers
Presidents of the International Society for the Systems Sciences